Robert Charles Berridge (born 13 September 1956 in Middlesbourgh) is a British racing driver. He won the title in the Historic Formula One Championship series three years in a row. In 1997, he won in a RAM 01 car and the next two years he won in a Williams FW08. He had previously competed in rounds of the British Touring Car Championship and British Formula Three Championship.

Career
Berridge won two Formula Ford 1600 titles in 1985 and 1986 was second in the Toyota Formula Three Championship in 1987. He later won the Porsche Club GB Championship in 1990. He won in the Historic Formula One Championship series three years in a row 1997, 1998, and 1999. In 1997, he won the title in a RAM 01 car, and then took the title the following two years he won in a Williams FW08.

Berridge raced in the Le Man Series from 2004 until 2008 and entered five Le Mans 24 Hour races. He also ran and drove for Chamberlain Synergy that won the LMS drivers and Team Championship in LMP 2 in 2005 and finished third in the Team Championship in LMP1 in 2006. Berridge won the inaugural Group C Championship in 2011 in a Mercedes Benz C11. He has also previously competed in rounds of the British Touring Car Championship Driving for Vauxhall with a self prepared Ford Cosworth Saphire, and British Formula Three Championship in the abortive Vision project in 1988. He has won over 200 races.

Racing record

Complete British Touring Car Championship results
(key) (Races in bold indicate pole position – 1990 in class) (Races in italics indicate fastest lap)

‡ Endurance driver (Ineligible for points)

24 Hours of Le Mans results

References

External links
 Career statistics from Driver Database

1956 births
Living people
British racing drivers
British Formula Three Championship drivers
British Touring Car Championship drivers
24 Hours of Le Mans drivers
European Le Mans Series drivers